William Fahmy Hanna (born 18 March 1928) is an Egyptian former middle-distance runner. He competed in the men's 1500 metres at the 1952 Summer Olympics.

References

External links
 

1928 births
Possibly living people
Athletes (track and field) at the 1952 Summer Olympics
Egyptian male middle-distance runners
Olympic athletes of Egypt
Place of birth missing (living people)